Luka Vidmar (born May 17, 1986) is a Slovenian professional ice hockey defenceman. He is currently playing for the SønderjyskE Ishockey of the Danish Metal Ligaen.

Playing career
After playing as a youth professionally for HDD Olimpija Ljubljana in the Slovenian Ice Hockey League, Vidmar moved to North America and attended the University of Alaska Anchorage where he played fours seasons of NCAA Division I ice hockey with the Alaska Anchorage Seawolves men's ice hockey team. He accumulated 33 points and 135 penalty minutes in 114 games with the Seawolves.

Vidmar began the 2011–12 ECHL season with the Las Vegas Wranglers where he played three games before signing with the Colorado Eagles on November 11, 2011.

Prior to the 2012–13 season, Vidmar remained in the ECHL after signing as a free agent with the South Carolina Stingrays on October 5, 2012.

After 10 years of playing in North America, Vidmar returned to Europe to sign a try-out contract with BK Mladá Boleslav of the Czech Extraliga on July 24, 2014.

Career statistics

Regular season and playoffs

International

References

External links

1986 births
Living people
Chicago Steel players
Colorado Eagles players
HDD Olimpija Ljubljana players
Las Vegas Wranglers players
Rochester Americans players
Slovenian ice hockey defencemen
South Carolina Stingrays players
Sportspeople from Ljubljana
Stjernen Hockey players
Ice hockey players at the 2018 Winter Olympics
Olympic ice hockey players of Slovenia